Under the Gun may refer to:

Film and television 
 Under the Gun (1951 film), an American film noir directed by Ted Tetzlaff
 Under the Gun (1995 film), an Australian action film by Matthew George
 Under the Gun, an Australian film of 1988
 Under the Gun, a 2016 documentary by Stephanie Soechtig about the Sandy Hook Elementary School shooting
 "Under the Gun", 2010 television episode from Castle (season 3)
 "Under the Gun", 1986 television episode, see list of Sledge Hammer! episodes

Music 
 Under the Gun (band), an American punk rock group 1997–2003

Albums 
 Under the Gun (Fighting Instinct album) or the title song, 2008
 Under the Gun (Poco album) or the title song, 1980
 Under the Gun (Tijuana Sweetheart album), 2012
 Under the Gun...A Portrait of Aldo Nova, by Aldo Nova, 2007

Songs 
 "Under the Gun" (The Sisters of Mercy song), 1993
 "Under the Gun", by Axel Rudi Pell from Shadow Zone, 2002
 "Under the Gun", by Aldo Nova from Aldo Nova, 1982
 "Under the Gun", by the Black Keys from Let's Rock, 2019
 "Under the Gun", by Blondie from No Exit, 1999
 "Under the Gun", by Circle Jerks from Golden Shower of Hits, 1983
 "Under the Gun", by Danger Danger from Danger Danger, 1989
 "Under the Gun", by Deep Purple from Perfect Strangers, 1984
 "Under the Gun", by Dokken from Long Way Home, 2002
 "Under the Gun", by Electric Guest from Mondo, 2012
 "Under the Gun", by Face to Face from Face to Face, 1984
 "Under the Gun", by Foreigner from Mr. Moonlight, 1994
 "Under the Gun", by the Killers from Sawdust, 2007
 "Under the Gun", by Kiss from Animalize, 1984
 "Under the Gun", by Kris Kristofferson and Willie Nelson from Music from Songwriter, 1984
 "Under the Gun", by Motörhead from Kiss of Death, 2006

Other uses 
 Under the gun, in poker terminology, a playing position
 Under the Gun Theater, a theater company in Chicago, Illinois, US

See also 
 Under the Gunn, a 2014 American reality competition TV series